Kathleen Elizabeth "Bunny" Gibson (born January 19, 1946) is an actress  and former regular dancer on the American Bandstand television program. Teen magazines referred to her as "American Bandstand's Sweetheart" and Dick Clark called her a "national symbol" receiving thousands of letters each week.

Early life

Kathleen Elizabeth Gibson was born in 1946 in Jersey City, New Jersey, and grew up in Darby, Pennsylvania near Philadelphia. Gibson started attending American Bandstand when she was thirteen years old, and was a regular dancer on the show from 1959 through 1961. She attended several Catholic schools in and near the Philadelphia area, and graduated from Northeast High School.

She also studied acting in New York with Warren Robertson, Stella Adler and Herbert Berghof.

Career

American Bandstand

She was introduced to American Bandstand as a 13-year-old when Bandstand regular Arlene Sullivan and her dance partner, Kenny Rossi, appeared at a swim club near her home, attracting a throng of screaming teenagers. When a friend told her who the dancers were, Gibson began watching the show and practiced the jitterbug with her refrigerator door. She made her first appearance on the show at the age of 13 so she could met her idol, Philadelphia singer Bobby Rydell.

Gibson soon became a regular dancer on the show and remained until 1961. Her regular dance partner was Eddie Kelly but she also danced with Steve Colanero, Johnny Alamia and Jay Jacovini. She had many fan clubs across the country and was listed in teen magazines' "popularity contests" alongside stars such as Elvis Presley, Frankie Avalon, Chubby Checker and Connie Francis. Gibson was regularly featured in articles in the most popular teen magazines of the day, such as 16, Dig and Teen Screen. Bandstand host Dick Clark once announced on air that Gibson had been named "Queen of the Shasta" by U.S. Navy men stationed aboard that ship.

Gibson would to tease her hair into a bouffant for American Bandstand, and in 2016 was invited to be a special guest at the Philadelphia VIP viewing party for Hairspray Live!, a show known for its big hair.

Acting

As a single mother, Gibson was an award-winning sculptor and did commercials in New York, including five national spots for Minute Rice. She also did commercials for Charmin, Panasonic, Acme Markets and McDonald's.

She moved to Los Angeles in 1983 to pursue her acting career. As Kathleen Klein, she eventually landed a role as Megan on ABC-TV's General Hospital. In the early 1990s, she appeared in two episodes of the Showtime series, Compromising Situations, and played a hard, cigar-smoking saloon operator in the film Rollerblade Warriors. She has also appeared in the movie No Ordinary Love (1997). "Dancing is our drug of Choice" Program receiving a Proclamation from the City of Philadelphia declaring "Dancing is our drug of Choice" day. The program continues today under her "Devoted to Youth" foundation where Bunny acts as the Vice President giving "Dance Contests" throughout Los Angeles for underprivileged children.

In 2010, Gibson was the lead dancer in the conga line scene of The Back-up Plan starring Jennifer Lopez. Other recent films in which she's had roles include Scout's Honor with Fred Willard, The Rainbow Tribe, I'm Going to Kill Leonard Riley, Creepshow 3, Karla, Betrothed, American Beach House, Shangri-La Suite and Allison's Choice.

Gibson's TV appearances include roles on Glee, Two and a Half Men, How I Met Your Mother, The Haunted Hathaways and The Protector. Inside America's Totally Unsolved Lifestyles and America's Most Wanted (fugitive James Knoll turned himself in after he saw the show that night). She has also appeared on many news and talk shows including Good Morning America, Extra, Geraldo Rivera, Suzanne Somers, Morton Downey Jr., Crook & Chase and Joe Franklin. A leopard skin jacket that Gibson popularized on American Bandstand in 1959, was worn in the January 8, 2004, episode of the American Dreams television program by actress Vanesa Lengles. Gibson plans to donate the jacket to the State Museum of Pennsylvania.

Gibson has appeared on several American Bandstand anniversary specials, portrayed herself on the History Channel's The Century Series and was the principal dancer on the 100th episode of How I Met Your Mother (episode entitled "Suits").

Gibson also has made TV appearances on "Casual" as Mara, "Life in Pieces" as Nancy and "Un Made" as Eleanor. Without a Trace ("Strong Medicine"), CSI: Crime Scene Investigation, pilot Keep Dreaming, pilot Can't We Just Get Along?, MTV Movie Awards, Conan O'Brien, Jamie's mother on Jamie Kennedy Experiment, Moby music video for "Natural Blues", as Moby's mom, Roxy Club dancer on Saturday Night Live, and was part of Fred Willard's "MoHos Sketch Comedy Group".

Bunny was a regular in the Jewish Life Television 2019 series "Bubbies Know Best" as a "bubbie" along with actresses Linda Rich and S.J. Mendelson, and host Erin Davis. As one of the three Jewish grandmothers on the "Bubbies Know Best" dating show, Bunny Gibson had an awkwardly humorous encounter in 2019 with Zach Galifianakis when he came on the show to promote his new movie. The bubbies turned it around on him and started talking about him hypothetically marrying Bunny, whether or not he was circumcised, and the size of his penis. The Bubbies have been guests on Access Hollywood, TMZ, and Steve Harvey.

Gibson has appeared in many "Funny or Die" videos, such as "Beauty and the Beast" Emma Watson and Dan Stevens video, "Parent News 2: What is the Internet" with Fred Willard, "Getaway Grandmother's Club", "Ransom", "Instagram Intervention with Troilan Bellisario", "Patton Oswalt Confronts His Haters",  and "Free Mammograms with Eric Andre,  "The Liarist" with Haley Joel Osment and "Christmas Caroling" with Brittany Snow.

Gibson also appeared with Derek Waters as Bernie Arthur's Mother in "Comedy Central's Non-Denominational Christmas Special".

Recent Music Videos include "Rapping" French Montana's "50's & 100's" as French Montana, playing "Chary" in T.J. Stafford's "Chary". Recent Music videos include T. J. Stafford's "Chary", "Licenciado Cantinas the Movie" with Enrique Bunbury, "Falling in Reverse" with Ronnie Radke and "I Am Robert Raimon Roy".

In 1998, Peter Jennings and Todd Brewster featured Gibson in their The Century Book and The Century Book for Young People, which is used in high schools across America. In the years since, Bunny has helped many students across America with term papers comparing their life with the way things were for her.

Charity

In the 1990s, Gibson founded an organization to help the homeless, Americans Sheltering America's Poor (ASAP). She converted an office into an apartment and distributed food from her car to the homeless on L.A.'s skid row.

In the late 1990s, Gibson started the "Dancing Is Our Drug of Choice" program, which continues today, conducting dance contests for foster children through the "Day of the Child."

Personal life

Bunny married Don Travarelli in 1963 and they had two daughters, Angel and Maria. Gibson has four grandchildren.

Although Gibson had been raised Catholic, she discovered late in life through DNA tests that she was half-Ashkenazi Jew, after which she set about learning of the religion, some Yiddish language, and embracing the culture.

References

Newspaper articles

 Archilla, Dylan M. Indianapolis Prime Times, "Growing Up On American Bandstand," September 13, 2003
 Blackmon, Robert. National Enquirer, "American Bandstand Made a Bride," May 21, 2002
 Brenner, Sheri. Northeast Times, "Bandstand's Bunny Still Hoppin'," August 13, 1997
 Burkhart, Michael T. Camden Courier-Post, "New Jersey Fans Delight In Dick Clark's Rockin Return," August 21, 2005
 Bust Magazine, July/August 2019
 Bykofsky, Stu. Philadelphia Daily News, "Teens for a Day," August 6, 1997
 Comegno, Carol. Courier-Post, March 25, 2019, South Jersey 'Bandstand' dancer talks new TV dating program on Steve Harvey's show
 Daly, Sean. Philadelphia Daily News, "Bandstand Goes Gold," April 24, 2002
 Darrow, Chuck. Camden Courier-Post, "South Jersey Dancers Recall Bandstand Days," April 28, 2002
 Detweiler, Margit. Philadelphia City Paper, "We're Goin' Hoppin'," April 4–10, 1997
 Dobuzinskis, Alex. Los Angeles Daily News, "Holding out for a hero," November 22, 2004
 Finnegan, Christian. "Bandstand Mural Celebrates a Classic," April 3–5, 2007
 Francis, Naila. Times Herald, "Teens high on anti-drug message," November 24, 1997
 Gross, Dan. Philadelphia Daily News, "Benefit for Bunny Gibson," October 11, 2006
 Gross, Dan. The Philadelphia Inquirer, January 11, 2010
 Gross, Dan. The Philadelphia Inquirer, June 2, 2009
 Gross, Dan. The Philadelphia Inquirer, June 29, 2009
 Grossberg, Josh. Daily Breeze, "Watching her life pass before your eyes," January 18, 2004
 Hype Magazine, February 8, 2019
 John-Hall, Annette. The Philadelphia Inquirer, "Nice beat, nasty ban," July 26, 2009
 Klein, Michael. The Philadelphia Inquirer, "A match made on Bandstand," January 13, 2002
 Kuklenski, Valerie. Woodland Hills (Calif.) Daily News, "Sock Hop On Stage," April 28, 2004
 Margit Detweiler. Philadelphia City Paper, "The in Crowd," August 1, 1997
 Martinez, Al. Los Angeles Times, "Bunny, Queen of the Hop," August 13, 1994
 McCarthy, Kelly. Main Line Today magazine, "Living An American Dream," January 2004
 Miller, Karalee. The Kansas City Star, "His dream girl becomes a reality," May 14, 2002
 Moorhouse, Ed. Burlington County Times, "Queen of the hop returns for the Celebration," August 3, 2007
 New York Newsday, March 18, 2019
 Ocamb,Karen. Los Angeles (Calif.) In, "The Gay Twist on American Bandstand," October 18, 2004
 Pacheco, Della. Indianapolis/Cincinnati Prime Times, "Growing up on American Bandstand," October 2003
 Parade magazine. "The Century: I saw it happen," November 8, 1998
 Philadelphia Broadcast Pioneers, March 5, 2019
 Philadelphia Weekend Metro. "Bandstand Mural Celebrates a Classic," August 3, 2007
 Prokop, Diane. Times Newspaper (Lifestyle Section), "Star in Her Eyes," April 29. 2010
 Prokup, Diane. Northeast Times NewsWeekly, "Those Were the Days," August 9, 2007
 Rama's Review, September 20, 2019
 Rothschild, Barbara S. Courier-Post, "Time on 'Bandstand' changed dancer's life," August 2, 2007
 Rowe, Mark. Valley Scene Magazine, "Rocking with American Bandstand," May 17–27, 2010
 Shannon, Trana. Valley Scene Magazine, "Original Bandstander dances with a new generation," May 14–27, 2004
 Starr, Michael. New York Post, "Star Report," September 24, 2003
 Szumowski, Debbie. Fishtown Star, Philadelphia A 0, "Bunny and Bob share Bandstand memories," January 28, 1998
 Takiff, Johnathan. Philadelphia Daily News, "A great friend turns 50," May 2, 2002
 Talent, Frank. South Philadelphia American, September 12, 1997
 Talent, Frank. South Philadelphia American, September 16, 1997
 The Argonaut, "Dancing - Return of the Regulars," January 15, 2003
 The A.V. Club, September 20, 2019
 The Savvy Screener, February 12, 2020
 The Savvy Screener, February 6, 2019
 Welch, Stephanie Hammonds. Primo Magazine, "American Bandstand," 1st Edition 2013
 Williams, Tom. The Sandpiper (N.J.), "American Bandstand's back with American Dreams," October 4, 2002

Books
 "The Century Book for Young People," Peter Jennings and Todd Brewster, Doubleday (1999),  p. 147 
 "Bandstand The Untold Story,"  Stanley J. Blitz, Cornucopia Productions (1997), p. 137 
 "Rock, Roll & Remember," Dick Clark and Richard Robinson,  Thomas Y. Crowell Company (1976), pgs. 75, 77, 79 
 "Dick Clark And The Making Of A Rock 'n' Roll Empire," John A. Jackson, Oxford University Press  (1997), pgs. 197, 210

External links

Bunny's personal website (archived)
Peter Jennings interviews Bunny Gibson about American Bandstand
Bunny Gibson and Steve Colaero on "Extra"
Bunny Gibson in old Bandstand studio
Bunny Gibson in old Bandstand studio
Bunny Gibson shows 1950s American Bandstand fashion on Crook & Chase Show
Enterprise Center, Philadelphia

1946 births
Living people
20th-century American actresses
21st-century American actresses
American film actresses
American female dancers
Dancers from New Jersey
American television actresses
Actresses from Jersey City, New Jersey